Ports of Lima is Jakarta-based indie band Sore's second full-length album.

Track listing

Line-Up

Band Member

 Ade Firza Paloh – Guitar, Vocals
 Awan Garnida – Bass, Vocals
 Ramondo Gascaro, – Keyboard, Vocals, Composer
 Reza Dwi Putranto – Guitar, Vocals
 Bemby Gusti Pramudya – Drums, Vocals
 Dono Firman – Synthesizer, Keyboard, Guitars

Credits

 Indra Aziz – Sax (Alto), Sax (Tenor), Soloist
 Reza Dwiputranto – Bass, Composer, Guitar (Acoustic), Guitar (Electric), Handclapping, Vocals, Vocals (Background)
 Awan Garnida – Bass, Vocals, Vocals (Background)
 Ario Hendrawan – Engineer, Arranger, Vocals (Background)
 Marty Paloh – Composer
 Andi Rianto – Piano
 David Tarigan – A&R
 Bemby Gusti – Bass, Bells, Bongos, Conga, Drums, Guitar (Acoustic), Guitar (Electric), Percussion, Piano, Rums, String Arrangements, Strings, Vibraphone, Vocals, Wood Block, Woodwind Arrangement
 Ramondo Gascaro – Artwork, Brass Arrangement, Choir Arrangement, Choir, Chorus, Drum Samples, Fender Rhodes, Flute, Guitar (Acoustic), Guitar (Electric), Guitar (Synthesizer), Handclapping, Harpsichord, Horn Arrangements, Mellotron, Organ, Organ (Hammond), Original Concept, Pianicca, Piano, Script, Shaker, String Arrangements, Strings, Synthesizer, Tambourine, Vibraphone, Vocals, Vocals (Background), Woodwind, Woodwind Arrangement.

References 

2008 albums
Concept albums
Sore (band) albums